Toxonprucha repentis is a species of moth in the family Erebidae first described by Augustus Radcliffe Grote in 1881. It is found in North America.

The MONA or Hodges number for Toxonprucha repentis is 8673.

References

Further reading

External links

 

Omopterini
Articles created by Qbugbot
Moths described in 1881